The 1937 Carnegie Tech Tartans football team represented the Carnegie Institute of Technology—now known as Carnegie Mellon University—as an independent during the 1937 college football season. Led by first-year head coach Bill Kern, the Tartans compiled a record of 2–5–1. Carnegie Tech played home games at Pitt Stadium in Pittsburgh.

Schedule

References

Carnegie Tech
Carnegie Mellon Tartans football seasons
Carnegie Tech Tartans football